The 50 kilometre cross-country skiing event was part of the cross-country skiing at the 1948 Winter Olympics programme. It was the fifth appearance of the event. The competition was held on Friday, 6 February 1948. Twenty-eight cross-country skiers from nine nations competed.

Medalists

Results

References

External links
Official Olympic Report
 

Men's 50 kilometre
Men's 50 kilometre cross-country skiing at the Winter Olympics